Shorenstein is a surname. Notable people with the surname include:

 Carole Shorenstein Hays (born 1948), American theatrical producer
 Douglas W. Shorenstein (1955–2015), American real estate developer
 Joan Shorenstein (1947–1985), American journalist and television producer
 Walter Shorenstein (1915–2010), American real estate developer

See also 
 Shorenstein Center on Media, Politics and Public Policy